Paradox is a mini-album released by the Japanese horror punk band Balzac.

Track listing
"Schiz-Ism I"
"Hazard"
"Paradox"
"Spiral"
"Space Vampire in Silence Noise"
"The Eyes (That See What Isn't There)"
"Schiz-Ism II"

Credits
 Hirosuke - vocals
 Atsushi - guitar, chorus
 Akio - bass guitar, chorus
 Takayuki - drums, chorus

Additional recording members 
 Ryan Moldenhauer - additional vocals

External links
Official Balzac Paradox site
Official Balzac Japan site
Official Balzac USA site
Official Balzac Europe site

2009 albums
Balzac (band) albums